Barm-e Siah (also Romanized as Barm-e Sīāh and Barm Sīyāh; also known as Barm-e Seyāh Shūr) is a village in Mahur Rural District, Mahvarmilani District, Mamasani County, Fars Province, Iran. At the 2006 census, its population was 911, in 182 families.

References 

Populated places in Mamasani County